The British Swimming Coaches Association (BSCA) is the national association for swimming coaches in the United Kingdom.

History
The organisation was formed in 1965. Many swimming coaches in the UK have qualified through the ASA (Amateur Swimming Association, now Swim England), via the Coach Education Certification Course. Other parts of the UK are represented by Scottish Swimming, Swim Wales and Swim Ireland. The BSCA was incorporated as a company in January 2010.

Function
It represents swimming coaches in the UK. It holds an annual 2-day BSCA Conference each year in late September. It holds the annual BSCA Awards. It works with British Swimming (former Great Britain Swimming Federation), who govern the sport in Great Britain.

The organisation is headquartered in Worcestershire. It is represented on the International Council for Coaching Excellence and the World Swimming Coaches Association.

References

External links
 BSCA

1965 establishments in the United Kingdom
Organisations based in Worcestershire
Physical education in the United Kingdom
Sport in Worcestershire
Sports organizations established in 1965
Swimming coaches
Swimming in the United Kingdom
Swimming organizations